The 1826 Canary Islands storm (also known as San Florencio Storm) was the worst weather-related disaster in the history of the Canary Islands, claiming at least 298 lives. It was likely either a tropical cyclone or a storm system derived from a tropical cyclone.

Meteorological history 
Alternatively, the storm might have been an extratropical cyclone that formed from a tropical system. The French naturalist Sabin Berthelot explicitly called this storm a "hurricane".

Impact 
The storm impacted the entire Canary Islands, with some islands disproportionately hit. It is still the worst known weather-related disaster in the history of the Canary Islands.

Trees and plantations were flattened and winds with gusts probably exceeding  damaged houses (reportedly 603 in Tenerife alone) and ships in ports (of which six were reportedly lost); the death toll in Tenerife reached 298 and sources speak of "floating cadavers" and "infinite number of dead".

Geomorphological changes also took place in the islands as a consequence of the storm, an alluvial fan on Teide and flood deposits on Lanzarote were most likely formed by it.

Records 
Research on past tropical cyclone activity in the Canary Islands has gained importance after Tropical Storm Delta passed through the islands in 2005, amid concerns of global warming. Other storm events with rainfall that affected the Canary Islands aside from Tropical Storm Delta occurred in December 1645, January 1713, October 1722, November 1922, January 1957 and December 1975; none, however, was as intense as the 1826 event.

References

Sources 

 
 
 
 

Hurricanes in the Canary Islands
1826 natural disasters 
Natural disasters in Spain
Canary Islands storm
November 1826 events 
1826 disasters in Spain